Cosmonette Glacier is a tributary glacier in the Southern Cross Mountains, flowing east along the north side of the Daley Hills to Aviator Glacier, in Victoria Land. It was named by the northern party of the New Zealand Geological Survey Antarctic Expedition, 1962–63, in association with Cosmonaut and Aeronaut Glaciers and to commemorate the first woman cosmonaut.

References
 

Glaciers of Victoria Land
Borchgrevink Coast